The Treaty of Tartu is a peace treaty that was signed in Tartu on 2 February 1920 between the Republic of Estonia and Soviet Russia, ending the 1918–1920 Estonian War of Independence. In the treaty, Bolshevik Russia recognized the independence of the newly established democratic state of Estonia. 

The terms of the treaty stated: "In consequence of the right of all peoples to self-determination, to the point of seceding completely from the State of which they form part, a right proclaimed by the Socialist and Federal Russian Republic of the Soviets, Russia unreservedly recognizes the independence and sovereignty of the State of Estonia, and renounces voluntarily and forever all sovereign rights possessed by Russia over the Estonian people and territory whether these rights be based on the juridical position that formerly existed in public law, or in the international treaties which, in the sense here indicated, lose their validity in future." Ratifications of the treaty were exchanged in Moscow on 30 March 1920. It was registered in League of Nations Treaty Series on 12 July 1922.

Estonia before the treaty
Estonia had been a province of Imperial Russia since 1721. In 1917, three years into World War I, the Russian Empire fell into revolution and civil war. As a part of this larger conflict, the Estonians declared independence from the then warring Russian and German Empires, and won their freedom during the Estonian War of Independence. The new Bolshevik Russian government acknowledged Estonia's freedom in the 1920 Treaty of Tartu.

Treaty provisions 
The treaty established the border between Estonia and Russia, affirmed the right of Estonian people to return to Estonia and Russian people to return to Russia and required that Estonian movable property evacuated to Russia in World War I be returned to Estonia. Russian Soviet Federative Socialist Republic also agreed to absolve all Russian Imperial debt and to pay Estonia 15 million gold rubles, a share from the gold reserves of the former Russian Empire. Additionally RSFSR agreed to grant concessions to exploit one million hectares of Russian forest land and to build a railway line from the Estonian border to Moscow.

Signatories 

The treaty was signed by Jaan Poska on the Estonian side and Adolf Joffe for Soviet Russia, as well as by other representatives of both parties.

Significance 
The Tartu Peace Treaty has been regarded as the birth certificate of the Republic of Estonia because it was the first de jure recognition of the state. The treaty was also of utmost importance to the diplomatically isolated Soviet Russia, with Lenin expressing satisfaction with the treaty as "an incomparable victory over Western imperialism". Some members of the Entente opposed the treaty with the intention to keep Soviet Russia in international isolation.

Aftermath 

After the signing, Soviet Russia did not fulfill several points of the treaty. For example, the museological collections of the University of Tartu have not been returned to this day from Voronezh and the migration of Estonians was obstructed.

In 1940-1941, and 1944-1991 Estonia was occupied by the Soviet Union. 

The Estonia-Russia border today leaves some land granted to Estonia by the Treaty of Tartu under Russian control.

See also 

 Latvian–Soviet Peace Treaty
 Soviet–Lithuanian Peace Treaty
 Treaty of Tartu (Finland–Russia)
 Peace of Riga (Poland, Soviet Russia and Soviet Ukraine)

References

External links
 Text of the treaty
 Which Continuity: The Tartu Peace Treaty of 2 February 1920, the Estonian–Russian Border Treaties of 18 May 2005, and the Legal Debate about Estonia’s Status in International Law

Estonian War of Independence
Tartu (Russian-Estonian)
Tartu (Russian-Estonian)
1920 in Estonia
Estonia–Russia relations
Estonia–Russia border
Tartu (Russian-Estonian)
Tartu (Russian-Estonian)
Tartu (Russian-Estonian)
History of Tartu
Tartu (Russian-Estonian)
February 1920 events
Peace treaties of the Soviet Union